The 2017 All-Ireland Senior Hurling Championship Final, the 130th event of its kind and the culmination of the 2017 All-Ireland Senior Hurling Championship, was played at Croke Park in Dublin on 3 September 2017.

The final was shown live in Ireland on RTÉ2 as part of The Sunday Game live programme, presented by Michael Lyster from Croke Park, with studio analysis from Liam Sheedy, Henry Shefflin and Ger Loughnane. Match commentary was provided by Marty Morrissey with analysis by Michael Duignan. The game was also shown live on Sky Sports, presented by Rachel Wyse and Brian Carney.	

Galway won their fifth All-Ireland title, winning by three points, it was their first title since 1988.

The match drew a peak audience of 1.1 million which made it the most watched RTÉ broadcast of 2017 up to then before being overtaken by the football final, it had an average audience of 901,500.

Background
The match-up was unusual for several reasons:
The first meeting of Galway and Waterford in the All-Ireland Hurling Final.		
The first final since 1996 not to involve one of the "Big Three" counties (Cork, Kilkenny and Tipperary).	
Galway had not won the All-Ireland since 1988 (29 years) and had lost six finals in the interim, 1990, 1993, 2001, 2005, 2012, and 2015.	
Waterford had not won the All-Ireland since 1959 (58 years) and had only appeared in two finals in the interim (1963 and 2008).

The match was the 11th championship meeting between Galway and Waterford, the first in 1938 with the most recent in 2011. Galway had never beaten Waterford in the championship.

Galway were looking to win their fifth All-Ireland title after winning in 1923, 1980, 1987, and 1988. Waterford were looking for a third title after winning in 1948 and 1959.

Paths to the final

Galway

Waterford

Pre-match

Jubilee team
The Kilkenny team that won the 1992 All-Ireland Final were presented to the crowd before the match to mark 25 years.

Ticketing
With a stadium capacity of 82,300, the 32 individual county boards received 60,000 tickets. Schools and third level colleges got 2,500 tickets, while season ticket holders were entitled to 5,500 tickets. 1,000 tickets were given to overseas clubs. The Camogie, Ladies' Football, Handball and Rounders Associations were each allocated about 200 tickets, as were the jubilee teams and mini-7s which play at half-time. Demand for tickets was very high in both counties with Galway and Waterford having receiving around 32,000 tickets between. Stand tickets were priced at €80 with terrace at €40.

Related events
The 2017 All-Ireland Minor Hurling Final was played between Galway and Cork as a curtain-raiser to the senior final, with Galway winning by 2-17 to 2-15.

Match summary

Officials
On 17 August 2017 the officials were chosen for the final by the GAA, with Tipperary's Fergal Horgan being named as the referee in what will be his first senior final.
Cork’s Colm Lyons was named as linesman and standby referee with Paud O’Dwyer of Carlow on the other line. The sideline official were Johnny Murphy from Limerick. The umpires were John Ryan, Paul Ryan, Mick Butler, and Sean Bradshaw.

Team news
During Galway's win in the semi-final, Adrian Tuohy was involved in an incident where the helmet of Tipperary player Bonner Maher was pulled off. It was confirmed a few days later that he would face no sanction arising from the incident and would be free to play in the final.

During the semi-final win against Cork, Waterford's Austin Gleeson in a similar incident to Adrian Tuohy's pulled Luke Meade’s helmet off his head in the first half. It was confirmed on 15 August that he would also escape punishment from the CCCC for the incident and would be free to play in the final.
It was confirmed on 22 August that Waterford's Conor Gleeson would miss the final after being handed a one-match ban after receiving a straight red card in the semi-final win against Cork.

Jonathan Glynn was named in the starting line-up for Galway for the first time in two years, replacing Niall Burke in the half-forward line. Tadhg de Búrca returned to the Waterford line-up after being suspended for the semi-final, replacing the banned Conor Gleeson.

Summary
Galway thundered into Waterford from the beginning giving na Déise very little room to breathe. Playing into the Davin end, Joe Canning  opened the scoring for Galway after 18 seconds with a point from out on the left which he hit over his left shoulder. Further points from Johnny Coen, Joseph Cooney, and Cathal Mannion gave Galway a four points to no score lead after four minutes. In the fifth minute, Kevin Moran scored Waterford's first score, a goal when he ran in on goal after collecting a pass from Michael Walsh to finish low to the left of the net. Kevin Moran got a point in the 11th minute to make the score 0-6 to 1-2. David Burke got his second point in the 21st minute to make it 0-10 to 1-4. In the 22nd minute, a high ball in from Kieran Bennett went all the way into the net after a mistake by Galway goalkeeper Colm Callanan when he tried to catch the ball after it bounced, this made the score 0-10 to 2-4. Galway had a one-point lead at half-time on a 0-14 to 2-7 scoreline.

In the second-half Pauric Mahony got the first point from a free to level the match after three minutes. Waterford had a one-point lead in the 43rd minute after another free from Pauric Mahony. Joe Canning leveled the match a minute later from a free. After fifty minutes Galway had a two pint lead on a 0-20 to 2-12 scoreline, and with ten minutes to play the Galway lead was one point. With five minutes to go the lead was four for Galway after a point from Jason Flynn. Joe Canning got Galway's last point in the last minute from another free to make it 0-26 to 2-16 with the final score of the match coming from another Pauric Mahony free in the first minute of the four minutes which were added on. Despite attempts by Waterford to score a goal and level the match, Galway held on to win by three points, 0-26 to 2-17.

Match details

Trophy presentation
Galway captain David Burke accepted the Liam MacCarthy Cup from GAA president Aogán Ó Fearghail in the Hogan Stand. During his speech Burke paid tribute to the late Tony Keady and Niall Donoghue. The Galway team then did a victory lap around Croke Park with the trophy.

Reaction
Highlights of the final were shown on The Sunday Game programme which aired at 9:30pm that night on RTÉ2 and was presented by Des Cahill with match analysis from Brendan Cummins, Eddie Brennan, and Anthony Daly. On the man of the match award shortlist were David Burke, Gearóid McInerney and Jamie Barron, with David Burke winning the award which was presented by GAA president Aogán Ó Fearghail at the City West hotel in Dublin where the post match Galway function was being held.

Celebrations
The Galway teams returned home on the 4 September were the homecoming event was held at Pearse Stadium, with the team arriving around 7:30pm, a crowd of around 20,000 turned put to greet the team. Before that the team stopped on the way at the Fair Green in Ballinasloe at 3pm where almost 15,000 people turned out.

References

All-Ireland Senior Hurling Championship Final
All-Ireland Senior Hurling Championship Final, 2017
All-Ireland Senior Hurling Championship Final
All-Ireland Senior Hurling Championship Finals